Tears Laid in Earth is the debut studio album by the doom metal band The 3rd and the Mortal. This album was the release in which the band was first categorized as a doom metal act; however, they have since experimented with genres such as progressive rock, jazz and electronica, making this their last true doom metal release. This was also the last album to feature singer Kari Rueslåtten.

Track listing

Personnel
 Kari Rueslåtten - vocals, synthesizer (on "Shaman" and "Song")
 Finn Olav Holthe - electric guitar, additional vocals (on "Death-Hymn")
 Geir Nilsen - electric guitar
 Trond Engum - electric guitar
 Bernt Rundberget - bass guitar
 Rune Hoemsnes - drums, percussion

Production Staff
 Terje Hansen - cover photography
 Paul Westum - cover design
 Hans Petter Vik - engineering, mixing
 Lars Lien - engineering, mixing
 Egil Tröa - sleeve photography

References

1994 debut albums
The 3rd and the Mortal albums